This is a list of Boston University Terriers football players in the NFL draft.

Key

Selections

References

Boston University

Boston University Terriers NFL draft